Adnan Dizdar (born 4 March 1949) is a Yugoslav handball player. He competed in the men's tournament at the 1980 Summer Olympics.

References

1949 births
Living people
Yugoslav male handball players
Olympic handball players of Yugoslavia
Handball players at the 1980 Summer Olympics
Place of birth missing (living people)